Zee Biskope is a Bhojpuri free-to-air movie channel launched by Zee Entertainment Enterprise Ltd.

Current broadcast 
Jaykara Sherawali Mai Ke

See also
List of Bhojpuri-language television channels

References

Bhojpuri-language television
Zee Entertainment Enterprises
Year of establishment missing
Movie channels in India